Dunkeld & Birnam railway station serves the town of Dunkeld and village of Birnam in Perth and Kinross, Scotland. Most services are operated by ScotRail, who also manage the station. LNER and Caledonian Sleeper also call some services here.

History
The station opened on 7 April 1856, as the terminus of the Perth and Dunkeld Railway from Stanley Junction (on the Scottish Midland Junction Railway).

From 1863 to 1896 the station master was John Kinnaird.

The station was host to a LMS caravan in 1935 and 1936 followed by two caravans from 1937 to 1939.

The station was the last in Scotland to be lit by gas lights, these not being replaced by electric versions until the early 1980s. Although the trackbed has been raised following reballasting over the years, the platforms have not had similar treatment and are all considerably sub-standard in height.  A couple of 'boxes' have been placed on both platforms to assist passengers to climb into the trains but, because the station is unstaffed, no assistance is available to move these aids into an appropriate position whenever a train arrives.

Facilities 
The station has a small car park (and some bike racks), which gives step-free access to platform 1, which has a bench and a waiting shelter. There is no step-free access (access is via a footbridge) - nor any facilities - on platform 2. As there are no facilities to purchase tickets, passengers must buy one in advance, or from the guard on the train.

Platform layout 
Platform 1 on the southbound line can accommodate trains having twelve coaches, but platform 2 on the northbound line can only hold ten. When no crossing is to be made, northbound trains are usually routed through platform 1 which is signalled for bi-directional running.

Passenger volume 

The statistics cover twelve month periods that start in April.

Services
On Sundays, there are 4 trains per day to Inverness (one of which extends to Elgin) and, southbound, four trains to Edinburgh Waverley (including the LNER Highland Chieftain service) and two to Glasgow Queen Street.

References

Bibliography

External links 

 Video footage of the station on YouTube

Railway stations in Perth and Kinross
Former Highland Railway stations
Railway stations in Great Britain opened in 1856
Railway stations served by ScotRail
Railway stations served by Caledonian Sleeper
Railway stations served by London North Eastern Railway
Category A listed buildings in Perth and Kinross